Kathleen Sullivan (born June 21, 1954, in Manchester, New Hampshire ) is an American attorney, and former chairwoman of the New Hampshire Democratic Party.

Early life
Kathleen Sullivan was born on June 21, 1954, in Manchester, New Hampshire. Her father, Henry P. Sullivan (1916–2003), was an attorney, state senator, state representative, and  candidate for governor; her mother, the former Mary McCaffrey (1919–1997), was a state representative.

Career
Sullivan is an attorney.

Sullivan served as the chairperson of the New Hampshire Democratic Party. She served as a member of the United States Electoral College in 2008, when she cast one of New Hampshire's four Electoral Votes for Barack Obama and Joe Biden. She was a superdelegate for Hillary Clinton in 2016.

Sullivan appears in the Marlo Poras documentary Run Granny Run about Doris Haddock's 2004 U.S. Senate campaign.

Personal life
Sullivan is married to John Rist, the principal of Manchester Central High School.

References

External links 
 Sullivan's profile on Wadleigh, Starr & Peters
 Sullivan's blog at The Huffington Post
 

1954 births
Living people
Politicians from Manchester, New Hampshire
College of the Holy Cross alumni
Cornell Law School alumni
American women lawyers
New Hampshire lawyers
New Hampshire Democrats
State political party chairs of New Hampshire
21st-century American women